The Chamundeshwari Electricity Supply Corporation Limited (CESC Mysore) is a company that provides electricity to five districts in the Indian State of Karnataka. It was carved out of Mangalore Electricity Supply Company Limited in 2005 and has its headquarters in Mysore. It is an undertaking of the government of Karnataka.

History 
The five districts of Chamarajanagar, Hassan, Kodagu, Mandya, Mysore were distributed electricity by Karnataka Power Transmission Corporation (KPTCL) since its formation in 1999 to 2002. Mangalore Electricity Supply Company Limited (MESCOM) was one of four companies that was formed in 2002 from KPTCL, and distributed to the said districts before CESC was carved out of it in 2005 to meet the increasing demand in power. Kodagu was added to its jurisdiction in 2006.

References

External links

 

Companies based in Karnataka
Electric power distribution network operators in India
State agencies of Karnataka
State electricity agencies of India
Energy in Karnataka
Indian companies established in 2005
2005 establishments in Karnataka